Sevasti Xanthou (Sevasti Kroustala-Xanthou) (1798–?) was the wife of Emmanuil Xanthos, member and one of the founders of Filiki Eteria ("Society of Friends"), a Greek conspiratorial organization against the Ottoman Empire.

Biography

Sevasti Xanthou lived in Arnavutköy, in Constantinople, along with her mother Mariora and her two sisters, Euphrosyne and Eleni. At the age of 17 (1815) and only a year after the foundation of Filiki Eteria, Sevasti married one of its founders, Emmanuil Xanthos. Together they had three children; Nicholas, Pericles and Aspasia. When the Greek Revolution broke out in 1821, her family, with her mother and sisters as well, moved from Constantinople to Izmail for safety reasons. In 1822, Sevasti felt that they were in hostile environment and on her initiative they left Izmail and moved to Chișinău. Emmanuil Xanthos was absent for long periods of time, firstly as a result of taking over the responsibility of organizing the Greek Revolution and secondly because of his inclusion in Margineni Monastery. During his absence, people he trusted took care of his family, like his brother in law, Michail Michaloglou (husband of Euphrosyne) and Michail Fokianos, who undertook the management of family finances.

Sevasti Xanthou experienced her husband's absence for many years, but coped nevertheless and raised her children, while, at the same time, she came into contact with several fighters, members of Filiki Eteria and prominent personalities of the time asking for help or information about her husband.

References

Bibliography
Tsimpani-Dalla Trisevgeni [Τσίμπανη-Δάλλα Τρισεύγενη], 27 Επιστολές της Σεβαστής προς τον Εμμανουήλ Ξάνθο, εκδ.Ιστορική και Εθνολογική Εταιρεία της Ελλάδος, Athens, 2014.
Panagiotopoulos V.P. [Παναγιωτόπουλος Β.Π.], Βαρώνος Κωνσταντίνος Μπέλλιος. Ένας ομογενής στην Αθήνα του 1836, ανάτυπο από τις "Εποχές", 17 Σεπτ. 1964 από τη σειρά: Σταθμοί προς τη νέα ελληνική κοινωνία.

External links
Ο Πάτμιος Εμμανουήλ Ξάνθος και η Φιλική Εταιρία. (Greek)

Xanthou Sevasti
Constantinopolitan Greeks
Year of death missing
Women in the Greek War of Independence
Members of the Filiki Eteria
People from Beşiktaş